Catenaria may refer to:
 An alternate spelling of catenary curve
 Catenaria Benth. 1852, a legume genus